Tom Durkin may refer to:
 Tom Durkin (sportscaster) (born 1950), American sportscaster and public address announcer
 Tom Durkin (artist) (1853–1902), Australian caricaturist and cartoonist
 Tom Durkin (soccer), American soccer coach

See also
 Thomas Durkin (disambiguation)